The Fiat Abarth 1000SP is a Group 4 and Group 6 sports racing car built by Abarth in 1966 and 1970.

Development
The car was built by engineer Mario Colucci, and based on the mechanics of the Fiat 600 extensively modified, to participate in the races reserved for Group 6 sports cars. For this reason, 50 road specimens were built to obtain homologation for racing.

Overview
This engine was equipped with two Weber 40 DCOE carburetors, while the lubrication was a wet-sump with a separate oil filter. The gearbox was a five-speed manual. The front of the vehicle was particularly sharp to allow a good flow of air through two openings that led to the water radiators. The suspensions in the front section were equipped with superimposed wishbones, stabilizer bars, coil springs, and telescopic shock absorbers, while in the rear section there were tubular oscillating arms, stabilizer bars, and coil springs, and telescopic shock absorbers. The bodywork was made of plastic to lighten the overall weight.

Racing history
The first race of the 1000SP was the Coppa dell Collina di Pistoia in 1966, where it finished fifth driven by Anzio Zucchi. Subsequently, she obtained the class victory and the third place overall in the 500 km of the Nurburgring with the driver Hans Hermann. Another noteworthy result was the class victory in the Aosta Pila climb with Leo Cella.

In 1968, after obtaining approval for Group 6, the 1000SP obtained the class victory in the Stellavena-Boscochiesanuova climb led by Paolo Lado and the first position at the 1000 km of Monza, a race valid for the Marche World Championship. Numerous other national and international successes followed.

References

Abarth vehicles
Fiat vehicles
Cars introduced in 1966
Sports cars
Rear-engined vehicles
Group 6 (racing) cars
Group 4 (racing) cars
Mid-engined cars
Rear mid-engine, rear-wheel-drive vehicles
Cars of Italy